Statistics of Swiss Super League in the 1983–84 season.

Overview
It was contested by 16 teams, and Grasshopper Club Zürich won the championship.

League standings

Championship play-off

Results

Sources
 Switzerland 1983–84 at RSSSF

Swiss Football League seasons
Swiss
1983–84 in Swiss football